The Order of Royal Purple was the female auxiliary of the Elks of Canada. Unlike their counterparts in the United States, who have never been officially recognized by the Benevolent and Protective Order of Elks, the ORP was officially recognized by the Elks of Canada.

History 
The Order of Royal Purple was founded in Vancouver, British Columbia in September 1914.

In 2014 the Supreme Executive of the Order of Royal Purple decided to secede from the Elks and start a new organization, the Canadian Royal Purple Society. Some locals, however, wished to remain with the Elks and these were integrated into the organization of the Elks of Canada as Royal Purple Elks Lodges. Approximately 75 of these new Canadian Royal Purple lodges were formed between August 2014 and Feb. 2015.

Ritual 
The Order was quite serious about its ritual. Its fraternal signs were not allowed be used in a lodge until the Bible was open nor after it was closed. The Order had passwords, regalia for formal dress, and a floral emblem. During the initiation rite the candidate was asked to promise "never to divulge any of the secrets of the order to anyone." The candidate had also to promise "...to defend every worthy member's reputation, never to wrong a member and always help a member in need". This obligation followed a prayer by the lodge chaplain and the singing of "In Charity's Sweet Name".
The Canadian Royal Purple has modernised much of its structure and operation and is a Not for Profit Federally Incorporated Organization. Members and Lodges have less restricted guidelines, allowing everyone's ideas to be considered.

Organization 
Local units of the Order were called "Lodges" and the national structure was called the "Supreme Lodge". In 1979 headquarters were located in Brandon, Manitoba. The last National Office was located at 200 - 2629 - 29th Avenue, Regina, Saskatchewan.

Membership 
In 1979 membership was open women who believed in a Supreme Being, were 18 years or old and had male relative in the Elks of Canada. Women who did not have a male relative who was an Elk could also be admitted, but could not make up more than 25% of a lodge. Members were accepted or rejected by a black cube system, with three black cubes being sufficient to reject a candidate for membership.

However, membership requirements at the time of the dissolution of the organization were: fourteen years of age, a resident of Canada, supporting democratic and lawful government and the purpose and objectives of the Order.

See also 
Emblem Club
Daughters of the Improved Benevolent and Protective Order of Elks of the World

References

External links 
Official website as of 2013, the last copy taken by the Wayback Machine

Benevolent and Protective Order of Elks
Organizations established in 1915
Women's organizations based in Canada
Organizations disestablished in 2015